Sand Creek is a stream in St. Francois County in the U.S. state of Missouri. It is a tributary of Wolf Creek.

Sand Creek was so named on account of sandstone deposits in the area.

See also
List of rivers of Missouri

References

Rivers of St. Francois County, Missouri
Rivers of Missouri